Józef Orwid (14 November 1891 – 13 August 1944) was a Polish stage and film actor. He died in the Warsaw Uprising.

Filmography
 10% dla mnie (1933)
 Każdemu wolno kochać (1933)
 Romeo i Julcia  (1933)
 Młody las (1934)
 ABC miłości (1935)
 Antek policmajster (1935) 
 Manewry miłosne (1935)
 Panienka z poste restante (1935)
 Wacuś (1935)
 30 karatów szczęścia (1936)
 Dodek na froncie  (1936)
 Dwa dni w raju (1936)
 Fredek uszczęśliwia świat (1936)
 Jadzia (1936)
 Mały marynarz (1936)
 Straszny dwór (1936)
 Wierna rzeka (1936)
 Książątko (1937) 
 Niedorajda (1937)  
 Pan redaktor szaleje (1937) 
 Pani minister tańczy (1937)  
 Parada Warszawy (1937)  
 Piętro wyżej (1937) 
 Trójka hultajska (1937)
 Ułan księcia Józefa (1937)
 Dziewczyna szuka miłości (1938)
 Florian (1938)
 Gehenna (1938)
 Królowa przedmieścia (1938)
 Paweł i Gaweł (1938)
 Robert and Bertram (1938)
 Serce matki (1938)
 Szczęśliwa trzynastka (1938)
 Zapomniana melodia (1938)
 Ja tu rządzę (1939)
 Przez łzy do szczęścia (1939)
 Sportowiec mimo woli (1939)
 Złota Maska (1939)

External links
 
 Józef Orwid at filmpolski.pl

Polish male stage actors
Polish male film actors
Polish cabaret performers
1891 births
1944 deaths
20th-century comedians
Polish civilians killed in World War II